Dany Placard is the stage name of Dany Gauthier (born 1977), a Canadian singer-songwriter from Laterrière, Quebec.

After studying music at the Université du Québec à Montréal, Placard independently released his debut album L'Agent Placard in 1998. He then formed the band Plywood 3/4, with whom he released two albums, before returning to a solo career with the 2005 album Rang de l'église. He won the Canadian Folk Music Award for Francophone Songwriter of the Year at the 9th Canadian Folk Music Awards in 2013 for his album Démon vert, and was a nominee in the same category at the 11th Canadian Folk Music Awards in 2015 for Santa Maria.

He played the title character in the 2015 short film Blue Thunder (Bleu tonnerre), and performed music for the soundtrack.

His 2020 album J'connais rien à l'astronomie and the 2021 followup EP Astronomie (suite) feature contributions from singer-songwriter Julie Doiron. Placard in turn appears on Doiron's 2021 album I Thought of You. In early 2022, Placard and Doiron announced that a collaborative album, Julie & Dany, would be released in April 2022.

Discography
L'Agent Placard - 1998
Rang de l'église - 2005
Raccourci - 2008
Placard - 2010
Démon vert - 2012
Santa Maria - 2014
Full Face - 2017
J'connais rien à l'astronomie - 2020
Astronomie (suite) - 2021
Julie & Dany - 2022, with Julie Doiron

References

1977 births
Living people
20th-century Canadian male singers
21st-century Canadian male singers
Canadian male singer-songwriters
Canadian folk singer-songwriters
Canadian rock singers
French-language singers of Canada
French Quebecers
Singers from Quebec
Musicians from Saguenay, Quebec
Canadian Folk Music Award winners